A self-discharger (or self-unloader) is a ship that is able to discharge its cargo using its own gear. The most common discharge method for bulk cargo is to use an excavator that is fitted on a traverse running over the vessel's entire hatch, and that is able to move sideways as well. Lake freighters on the Great Lakes use conveyor-based unloading gear to empty funnel-shaped holds from the bottom, lifting the bulk cargo onto a boom.

See also
Boland and Cornelius Company
Adam E. Cornelius

References 

Water transport